Laephotis (known as the African long-eared bat) is a genus of bats in the family Vespertilionidae. Species within this genus are:

Angolan long-eared bat (Laephotis angolensis)
Botswanan long-eared bat (Laephotis botswanae)
Cape serotine (Laephotis capensis)
East African serotine (Laephotis kirinyaga)
Isalo serotine (Laephotis malagasyensis)
Malagasy serotine (Laephotis matroka)
Namib long-eared bat (Laephotis namibensis)
Roberts's serotine (Laephotis robertsi)
Stanley's serotine (Laephotis stanleyi)
De Winton's long-eared bat (Laephotis wintoni)
Some species in this genus were formerly classified in Neoromicia before phylogenetic analysis placed them in Laephotis.

References

 
Bat genera
Taxa named by Oldfield Thomas